Usse may refer to:

 Ussé, a château of the Loire Valley
 Üsse, Estonia

See also

 Uess
 Use (disambiguation)